Heosphora neurica is a moth in the family Pyralidae. The species was first described by Alfred Jefferis Turner in 1913. It is found in Australia.

References 

Pyralidae
Taxa named by Alfred Jefferis Turner
Moths of Australia
Moths described in 1913